Margot Madelaine Boer (born 7 August 1985) is a Dutch former speed skater. She specialised in the 500, 1000 and 1500 m.

Sports career
After spending a few years at local teams in the South Holland area, Boer was seen as one of the Netherlands main future talents and was offered a contract at the KNSB youth development team for the 2006–07 season. In the years before she already participated in several World Cup meetings.

Her first success in her new team was winning a gold medal in the 500 m at the 2007 KNSB Dutch Single Distance Championships. She won both races beating all the opponents, including favourites such as Marianne Timmer and Annette Gerritsen.

2010 Winter Olympics
Boer qualified to participate in all of her specialty distances at the 2010 Winter Olympics in Vancouver. She just missed out on medals in each of them, coming in 4th on both the 500 and 1500 m and 6th on the 1000 m, 0.22, 0.14, and 0.22 seconds from winning a bronze medal, respectively.

2014 Winter Olympics
On 11 February 2014, Boer won the bronze medal in the women's 500 m longtrack speedskating event at the 2014 Sochi Winter Olympics. This is the first medal at the Olympic women's 500 m longtrack speedskating event for the Netherlands. Two days later on 13 February 2014 Boer also won the bronze medal in the women's longtrack 1000 m event, making her the nation's first female skater to win Olympic medals on both sprint distances.

Personal records

Tournament overview

Source:

References

External links

 
 
 
 
 Official website
 Profile page of Margot Boer on Teamliga.nl

1985 births
Dutch female speed skaters
Speed skaters at the 2010 Winter Olympics
Speed skaters at the 2014 Winter Olympics
Olympic speed skaters of the Netherlands
Medalists at the 2014 Winter Olympics
Olympic medalists in speed skating
Olympic bronze medalists for the Netherlands
People from Woubrugge
Living people
World Single Distances Speed Skating Championships medalists
World Sprint Speed Skating Championships medalists
Sportspeople from South Holland
21st-century Dutch women